Simonovic may refer to:

 Simonović, a Serbian surname
 Šimonović, a Croatian surname